Abiaca Creek is a stream in Carroll, Leflore and Holmes counties in the U.S. state of Mississippi.

Abiaca is a name derived from the Choctaw language meaning "the side of a swamp or creek". Variant names are "Abaytche Creek", "Abiacha Creek", "Abyache Creek", "Abyatcch Creek", "Abyatchie Creek", and "Coila Abiache Creek".

References

Rivers of Mississippi
Rivers of Carroll County, Mississippi
Rivers of Leflore County, Mississippi
Rivers of Holmes County, Mississippi
Mississippi placenames of Native American origin